Delegation is a musical group formed in 1976 by Len Coley, Rick Bailey on lead vocals and Roddy Harris. The trio was soon discovered by music producer/songwriter, Ken Gold, who also wrote and produced the hits "You to Me Are Everything", and "Can't Get By Without You" for the Real Thing. Ken and his writing partner, Micky Denne, also wrote songs for Aretha Franklin, Jackie Wilson, and Cliff Richard.

History
In 1976, Delegation released their first single, "The Promise of Love", taken from their debut album of the same name, and released on the State Records label, although it wasn’t successful. Their second single, "Where Is the Love (We Used to Know)" also from the same album, charted in United Kingdom in April 1977, and gave the group their first hit, and consequently, their first Top of the Pops appearance.

Ray Patterson replaced Roddy Harris later that year and the group released their third single, "You've Been Doing Me Wrong", which became their second hit from the Promise of Love album. "Oh Honey", a smooth ballad, gave the group their first US hit in 1979. This song reached #5 in the US Billboard R&B charts.

Coley later left the band and Bruce Dunbar took his place. Their second album Eau De Vie was released in 1979. This album turned out to be very successful, including the hits "You and I", "Put a Little Love on Me", "Heartache #9," and "Darling (I Think About You)". Bruce Left the Group 1981 and returned to the US after their third album entitled Delegation, and the group continued on with lesser success.

In the U.S., Eau De Vie was released as Delegation in 1980, while their actual album Delegation from 1981 was released as Delegation II, both with alternate covers. 

They followed with Deuces High in 1982. All charted in Europe, but not in the United States. The act recorded a couple more singles, and continued to perform through the end of the decade. The record "It's Your Turn", released on Epic was successful only in France, although did well on the club scene across the United Kingdom, with an ultimate change of members, through the addition of Texas born vocalist Kathy Bryant, thus becoming the first female member of the group. Two years later, in 1985, they released "Thanks to You". The Mix on Scorpio Records, a segue compilation of five of their greatest hits, also sold poorly.

Bailey reunited with Gold, to form Euro Jam Records in the mid-1990s, repackaging Delegation's earlier recordings into new compilation albums and reforming the group to release Encore in Europe in 1999, but this was Delegation's final recording.

Discography

Albums

Singles

See also
List of performances on Top of the Pops

References

External links
 Delegation at Discogs.

Musical groups established in 1975
British soul musical groups